The Landakot School, established in 1896, is Iceland's oldest and longest-running private school, and one of the oldest running schools in Iceland of any type. Students attending the school range in age from 5–16 years old; in Iceland this is K-10th grade.

Located in central Reykjavík, Landakotsskóli is an independent, non-denominational day school, There are currently around 200 students in the school. The school admits students from all nationalities.

Academics
Landakotskóli follows the National Icelandic Curriculum with an emphasis on mathematics, languages, arts and an innovative art curriculum. Its academic record is strong based on a longstanding tradition of outstanding results. The school's International Department follows the Cambridge Curriculum developed by the University of Cambridge. The program covers the key core subject areas of English, mathematics and science. This curriculum provides continuous and flexible assessment as well as standardized assessment at each milestone in a student's educational career.

International Department
The school's new (established 2015–16) international department was inspired by the increasing diversity of the school's student body and the city's need for an international program to meet the needs of Iceland's expatriate business, diplomatic and academic community; families temporarily resident in Iceland; students returning from abroad who wish to continue their studies in English; and Icelandic families seeking global perspectives in education. The school has a strong academic record, based on a longstanding tradition of outstanding results in national examinations, and an emphasis on foreign languages and an innovative arts curriculum, provide a solid foundation on which to develop an international program.

While core subjects are taught in separate classrooms, students in the International Department are fully integrated into Landakotsskóli student life. They study alongside their peers in the Icelandic program in art, dance, drama, gym, swimming, technology and woodworking. In addition to core subjects, arts and sports, the Department offers many other activities such as STEM, Lego Robotics, computer programming, Chinese, drama, music and chess.

MAP testing
MAP (Measures of Academic Progress) from the Northwest Evaluation Association is a powerful assessment tool engineered to adapt to each student´s learning level and provide a holistic picture of his/her academic progress and growth.

United States involvement
In 2006, the United States Embassy presented 110 English language books to the school. These books covered a wide variety of topics. This donation was part of the Embassy's initiative to support the teaching of English.

See also
 Education and science in Iceland
 Education in Iceland
 Iceland

References

External links

Education in Iceland
Educational organizations based in Iceland
Schools in Iceland